Ricardo Jorge Raineri Bernain (born November 25, 1961) is an economist, academic, researcher, consultant, and politician.  On February 9, 2010, Chile's current President Sebastián Piñera nominated him to the Ministry of Energy.

Biography
Raineri completed his studies at the Adventist high school in Santiago, Chile. He went on to major in Business at the Pontifical Catholic University of Chile in 1987. He completed his Masters of Arts in 1991 and Ph.D. in 1993 at the University of Minnesota. His studies concentrated on industrial organization and regulation, and monetary economics. He is married and the father of three children.

Career
Upon his return to his country Chile, Raineri joined the Department of Industrial Engineering and of the School of Engineering Systems at his Alma mater, the Pontifical Catholic University of Chile, as a  professor and researcher. He would later become the director of the department between April 1998 and April 2002. He was also managing director and economic coordinator in the Department of Industrial Engineering and Systems between March 1994 and October 1995.

He collaborated with Sebastián Piñera as a coordinator in the area of energy of the group Tantauco.

In 2012, he was appointed as alternate executive director of the World Bank Group representing Argentina, Bolivia, Chile, Paraguay, Peru, and Uruguay.

In 2012, he was elected by experts around the world for a period of two years as vice president for academic affairs of the International Association for Energy Economics. In 2014 was re-elected for a second two-year term (2015–16). In 2015 he was elected as IAEE president-elect for 2016 and as IAEE president for 2017.

Politics
On February 9, 2010, Chilean president Sebastián Piñera named him to his cabinet as Minister of Energy.

His achievements leading the Ministry of Energy were presented on Tuesday, January 5, 2011, in the Montt Varas Hall of the Palacio de La Moneda. In this public hearing, he highlighted community support projects, the promotion of non-conventional renewable energies, security of supply and energy efficiency, among others, such as:

1.- Referring to the earthquake that hit the country on February 27, 2010, and which quickly forced the reformulation of the work agenda, the following actions were prioritized:

 Replenishment of gas supply in Concepción, Hualpén and Talcahuano in 1 and a half months, having previously announced by GasSur that it would be replaced in 12 months.
 Recovery of the ENAP refineries in a record time of two and a half months of the earthquake, which ensured the supply of gasoline.
 An emergency communications protocol was developed for the first time, with the aim of maintaining situations in situations of authority.
 $833 million was invested in an innovative plan developed in conjunction with FOSIS, “Sustainable Quinchos” aimed at saving energy in emergency villages benefiting hundreds of affected families.

2.- The processing of several bills was initiated:

 Draft Law on Electric Concessions. An initiative that aims to simplify the rules for the installation of energy projects respecting the environmental standards and the rights of the owners.
 Draft Law on Firewood Artifacts.
 VAD of Magellan gas.
 Geothermal Bill.
 Project to ensure that 20% of the generation was based on NCRE.

3.- The project called “Virtual Gas Pipeline” was promoted and worked to bring natural gas to the eighth region inaugurated at the beginning of 2011.

4.- 7 measures were promoted to strengthen the security of the electrical system:

 Provide the Center for Economic Cargo Dispatch (CDEC) with the best technical elements to visualize and analyze the electrical system online. This means significant investments in monitoring systems, analysis programs and their adequate support, to always be anticipating events that may cause their decisions or eventual failures.
 The companies had to carry out permanent training and certifications to their workers who perform critical activities.
 The highest international standards were required to certify maintenance, operations and maneuvering programs.
 It was possible to deepen the autonomy of the CDEC regarding the directions of toll operation and budget.
 Ensure the participation of the CDEC in the planning and development of the system.
 And, the last two measures focus on the design characteristics of the trunk system expansion works, which should be developed respecting the established safety criteria, such as the n-1 criterion.

5.- With the objective of ensuring that Chile has a safe and reliable energy supply, a key resource for the economic and social development of the country, the Energy Security Committee was created, which established a permanent dialogue table with the key actors of the sector to address issues of industry development, implementation of best practices, regulatory framework, and others.

6.- 4 hydroelectric micro-power stations were inaugurated in the municipality of Cochamó, benefiting 132 families and 4 rural public establishments.

7.- Progress was made in having 50% of photovoltaic system installations to benefit 30 rural schools in the northern part of the country, belonging to the “Educate with energy” program.

8.- 180 million were transferred to the Ministry of Justice, to provide hot water from solar technology, to more than 500 inmates of the mother and child units of women's prisons in Antofagasta, Concepción and Santiago. Funds were transferred to Easter Island and the Valparaíso Region for $360 million for the development of renewable energy. A system of thermal solar collectors was inaugurated, which from the sun supply hot water to the Special Development School, located in La Reina. An establishment where children with different types of intellectual disabilities attend. With this measure, 70 students from the boarding school benefited and the establishment will also save about 2 million pesos annually in the gas bill. On the other hand, environmental care is also supported by reducing greenhouse gas emissions. In the municipality of Lo Espejo with the housing committee "Juntas Podemos", the Ministry of Energy provided resources and technical advice to incorporate energy efficiency and non-conventional renewable energy. These and other projects were framed in the achievements of the Access and Energy Equity division.

9.- Energy Efficiency Labeling Program, so that people at the time of acquiring a certain product have the necessary information to make an intelligent purchase.

10.- Labeling of new vehicles and homes.

11.- Creation of the Chilean Energy Efficiency Agency, ACHEE.

12.- Cooperation agreements with New Zealand, France, California. In addition to achieving a significant approach on Energy issues with Argentina, Peru, and Bolivia. Working groups were formed to advance issues of mutual interest such as geothermal energy, hydroelectricity and non-conventional renewable energies in general.

13.- The process began to be members of the International Energy Agency IEA, an organization to which only countries of the Organization for Economic Cooperation and Development can belong.

14.- Tenders for concessions in geothermal exploration areas, the tendering of fiscal lands for wind and solar projects, and resources for pilot projects such as biomass, solar, tidal, wind, were increased significantly.

In addition, and in a very important way, in its period it was conceived, announced and initiated to work for the interconnection of the SIC with the SING, which is the main electrical transmission work of the last decades in the country and that has facilitated the development of the NCRE and energy exchange between what was the SIC and the SING.

Following the 2011 Magallanes protests in January he resigned after supporting a price increase for natural gas, a resource whose price was heavily subsidized in a region where natural gas reserves were estimated to last a few years given the high levels of consumption and lack of investments in exploration and new production wells. His resignation allows the government to revert the price increase, which leads the way to an increasing energy shortage in the region.

References

External links
 

1961 births
Living people
Government ministers of Chile
Academic staff of the Pontifical Catholic University of Chile
20th-century Chilean economists
Chilean people of French descent
Chilean people of Italian descent
Pontifical Catholic University of Chile alumni
University of Minnesota alumni
21st-century Chilean economists